Pierre-Joseph Alary (19 March 1689, Paris – 15 December 1770) was a French ecclesiastic and writer.

Biography
Prior of Gournay-sur-Marne and sous-précepteur to Louis XV, he attended the salon of Madame de Lambert, was elected to the Académie française in 1723 and was the main founder of the Club de l'Entresol, an early modern think tank that operated until 1731.

Bachaumont commented on Alary's election to the Académie française:

Alary's successor in the Académie, Gabriel-Henri Gaillard, gave a completely different portrait:

References

Further reading
Nicolas Clément, L'abbé Alary : 1690-1770. Un homme d'influence au XVIIIe siècle, H. Champion, Paris, 2002.

1689 births
1770 deaths
18th-century French writers
18th-century French male writers